National Public School may refer to several private schools in India:

 National Public School, Banashankari, Bangalore, Karnataka
 National Public School, Indiranagar, Bangalore, Karnataka
 National Public School, Koramangala, Bangalore, Karnataka
 National Public School, Rajajinagar, Bangalore, Karnataka
 National Public School, Chennai
 National Public School, Hazaribagh, Jharkhand
 National Public School, Hanumangarh, Rajasthan
 National Public School, Baheri, Uttar Pradesh

See also
 BGS National Public School, Hulimavu, Bangalore